The Taalkommissie ("Language Commission") is a subsidiary of the  ("South African Academy for Science and Arts") that serves as the technical committee of the  ("National Language Body for Afrikaans"), which is the language regulator of the Afrikaans language.

It is held as an authoritative source for the spelling of Afrikaans words.

Furthermore it takes cognisance of Afrikaans grammar and the natural developments in the Afrikaans language community, such as new terminology which emerges in technology and other disciplines. Its coverage of varieties of Standard Afrikaans is being expanded, which includes the Nama, Griqua and Kaaps varieties. A large corpus of the words used in the Afrikaans Muslim community is also included in the AWS.

See also 
 Pan South African Language Board

References

External links 
  

1909 establishments in South Africa
Afrikaans
Language regulators
Organizations established in 1909